Santhabommali is a village in Srikakulam district of the Indian state of Andhra Pradesh.

Demographics
 Indian census, the demographic details of Santhabommali mandal is as follows:
 Total Population: 	64,845	in 14,585 Households
 Male Population: 	32,198	and Female Population: 	32,647		
 Children Under 6-years of age: 9,171	(Boys -	4,595 and Girls - 4,576)
 Total Literates: 	27,166

References

Villages in Srikakulam district
Mandal headquarters in Srikakulam district